Ralph I may refer to:

 Rudolph of France (c. 890 – 936)
 Ralph I, Count of Vermandois (1085–1152)
 Ralph I, Lord of Coucy (c. 1134 – 1191)
 Ralph I, Count of Eu (b. 1160/1165 – d. 1219)
 Raoul I of Brienne, Count of Eu (d. 1344)
 The fictional King Ralph

See also
 Ralph (disambiguation)
 Raoul (disambiguation)
 Raul (disambiguation)